Statolith may refer to:

 A structure in the statocyst, which allows certain invertebrates to sense gravity and balance
 A structure in the statocyte, cells which allow plants to sense gravity